Azhage Unnai Aarathikkiren! is a 1979 Indian Tamil-language romance film directed by C. V. Sridhar and produced by B. Bharani Reddy. The Tamil version stars Vijayakumar, Latha (who stars in all three versions) and Jai Ganesh. The film was simultaneously shot in Kannada and Telugu as Urvashi Neenu Nanna Preyasi and Urvasi Neeve Naa Preyasi (1979) respectively. The Kannada version stars Srinath and Ramakrishna while the Telugu version stars Murali Mohan and Sarath Babu. The film was Subhashini's debut in Tamil cinema.

Plot 
Vani, a middle-class woman, lives with her brother, his wife and their chirpy teenage daughter Vasanthi. Victor, a mechanic, is their family friend. Victor introduces Vasu to Vaani's family when they are looking for a tenant and Vasu moves into the top portion of their house. Vasu is deeply in love with Vani but is disappointed to find that Vani is already romantically involved with Venu. However, Venu turns out to be lecherous and deceitful and he vanishes from Vani's life after being physically intimate with her one night after a party.

In a double blow to Vani, both her brother and his wife are killed in an accident. Vani turns despondent and takes to sleeping pills but recovers with Vasu's assistance and starts taking care of Vasanthi as well. Vasanthi soon falls in love with Vimal (Prakash), son of a rich businessman. To help Vani recover fully, Vasu asks her and Vasanthi to accompany him to Goa where he has been deputed to on duty for a couple of months. While in Goa, Vasu reveals his true feelings for Vani and desires to marry her even after she reveals her past affair with Venu.

Vani asks Vasu for some time to decide, but is thrown into a turmoil when she suddenly encounters Venu in Goa. Venu convinces her that his disappearance was circumstantial and he never intended to deceive her and Vani agrees to get back with him. Vasu, though his hopes have been dashed, wishes her well. However, the conniving two-faced Venu is just lusting over Vasanthi and plans to use Vani to satisfy his quest. What happens next forms the rest of the story.

Cast 
Vijayakumar (Tamil) / Srinath (Kannada) / Murali Mohan (Telugu) as Vasu
Latha as Vani
Jai Ganesh (Tamil) / Ramakrishna (Kannada) / Sarath Babu (Telugu) as Venu 
Nagesh (Tamil/Telugu) / Dwarakish (Kannada) as Victor
Prakash as Vimal
Subhashini as Vasanthi
Tamil version
V. S. Raghavan
V. Gopalakrishnan
Kannada version
Shivaram
Telugu version
Gokina Rama Rao
Raavi Kondala Rao

Soundtrack 
The music was composed by Ilaiyaraaja. The song "En Kalyana Vaibhogam" is set to Madhyamavati raga.
Tamil track list

Kannada track list

Reception 
Kausikan of Kalki praised the performances of cast, music and cinematography and concluded we wish that Sridhar would often make us relate to youth and beauty like this. The film was a box office failure.

References

External links 
 

1979 multilingual films
1970s Tamil-language films
1979 films
Films directed by C. V. Sridhar
Films scored by Ilaiyaraaja
Indian multilingual films
Indian romance films